Sunpu or Sumpu may refer to:

The former name of Shizuoka, Shizuoka, Japan
Sunpu Domain, a Japanese feudal domain during the Edo period centered in Suruga Province
Sunpu Castle, a former castle in Shizuoka City, Shizuoka Prefecture, Japan
Sunpu jōdai, officials of the Tokugawa shogunate during the Edo period Japan